Božena Zelinková (21 May 1869 – 18 June 1936) was a Czech teacher and women's rights activist.

Biography
Zelinková was born in Semtěš in 1869.

In 1908, using a legal loophole, together with Karla Máchová and Marie Tůmová, she was among the first three women to unsuccessfully run for the Bohemian Diet. Zelinková ran for the Německý Brod–Humpolec–Polná district. However, she withdrew from the race just before the date of the elections.

References

1869 births
1936 deaths
People from Kutná Hora District
Czech schoolteachers
Czech suffragists